Niaz Fatehpuri (1884–1966) was the pen name of  Niyaz Muhammed Khan, a Pakistani Urdu poet, writer, and polemicist. He was also the founder and editor of Nigar. In 1962, he was awarded the Padma Bhushan by the President of India for "Literature and Education."

Early life

Niaz Fatehpuri was born in 1884 at Nayi Ghat, Barabanki district, in what is now Uttar Pradesh during the British Raj. He died in 1966 in Karachi, Pakistan. Niaz Fatehpuri’s real name was Mawlānā Niyaz Muhammad Khan. He was educated at Madrasa Islamia in Fatehpur, Madrasa Alia in Rampur, and Darul Uloom Nadwatul Ulama in Lucknow. He resigned his post in 1902 as a Police Sub-Inspector after working in this capacity for a couple of years. Thereafter, he worked in different posts until 1921, when he started editing and publishing his famous monthly journal, Nigar, which served as a mirror to the literary scene in Uttar Pradesh till his migration to Pakistan in the early sixties.

His publications include:
 Man-o-Yazdan (on religion)
 Shahvaniyat (on sociology)
 Maktubat (his letters)
 Intiqadiyat (criticism)
 Jamalistan and Nigaristan (both short-stories) in 1939
 Shaair ka Anjam ("Fate of the Poet") in 1913
 Jazhabat-e-Bhasha (an appreciation of Hindi poetry), 2nd edn., in 1926
 Gahvara-e-Tamaddun (account of the role of women in the development of culture) in 1932
 Hindi Shaeri (on Hindi poetry) in 1936
 Targhibat-e-Jinsiya Sahvaniyat (on the development of sex knowledge) in 1941
 Husn ki Aiyariyan aur Dusre Afsane (short stories) in 1943
 Jhansi ki Rani in 1946
 Mukhtarat-i-Niyazi in 1947
 Naqab Uth Jane ke Bad in 1942
 Chand ghante hukmae qadim ki ruhon ke sath aur mazamin (three essays)
 Muttaleat-e-Niyaz (literary and historical essays) in 1947
 Taammulat-e-Niyaz (collection of articles), edited and published 1951;
 3 volumes of his letters from 1948 to 1951
 Muzakirat-e-Niyaz (some pages of diary) in 1932
 Majmuah Istifsar va Javab (a collection of questions and answers on different topics) in 1938
 Sahabiyat (on some female followers of the Prophet Muhammad) in 1932

Literary activities

Niaz Fatehpuri was a fiction-writer of repute, whose Urdu short-stories, which are poems in prose, are considered to be on a par with those of Munshi Premchand and find a prominent place in Urdu literature. He was also an Urdu poet and critic, and a polemicist who dared to raise his voice against Fundamentalism.

Until he migrated to Pakistan in 1962, he had continued to publish and edit Nigar the Urdu monthly journal, which he had launched in 1921. This was originally published from Agra, then from Bhopal and subsequently from Lucknow. It is still published from Karachi by Farman Fatehpuri.

Niaz Fatehpuri wrote on Urdu literature, on religion and on the many evils affecting the social fabric of India in his time. He has more than two dozen major works to his credit. He was awarded the Padma Bhushan in 1962 for his services to Urdu.

He died in Karachi, Pakistan on 24 May 1966.

Analysis

In 1974, Malik Ram included him in his award-winning book of essays Woh Surten Ilahi (The Immortals) on nine unforgettable giants in the Urdu literary world.

In 1986, the Urdu Academy in Karachi published the book "Niaz Fatehpuri: Shakhsiyat aur Fikr–o–Fan" by Farman Fatehpuri on the life and literary works of Niaz Fatehpuri.

Personal
He is the father of Sarfaraz Niazi, who has translated Ghalib's poetry into English in two books titled Love Sonnets of Ghalib and The Wine of Passion, both published by Ferozsons, Lahore, Pakistan.

References

Pakistani poets
Pakistani scholars
Urdu-language short story writers
Recipients of the Padma Bhushan in literature & education
1884 births
1966 deaths
Muhajir people
Writers from Karachi
Date of birth missing
Indian emigrants to Pakistan